Rosie Jones may refer to:
 Rosie Jones (golfer) (born 1959), American golfer
 Rosie Jones (comedian), British actress and comedian
 Rosie Jones, a character in the 2005 British film Keeping Mum

See also
 Sweet Rosie Jones (1968), country music album by Buck Owens and his Buckaroos
 Rosie Llewellyn-Jones, Lucknow cultural historian based in London